Helen Berman (born 6 April 1936) is a Dutch-Israeli visual artist. She was a textile designer in the 1960s and has been a painter and occasionally an art educator since the 1970s. She is well known in Israel and has exhibited also in Germany and the Netherlands. She created modern and postmodern art and has engaged in realistic impressionism and lyrical abstract expressionism.

Biography
Helen Berman was born in Amsterdam and as a young girl survived The Holocaust. She was trained as a textile designer at the Design Academy Eindhoven. While at the academy, she took extracurricular coursework in the free arts with Kees Bol and Jan Gregoor. After her graduation in 1960, Helen Berman designed textiles for several companies. Some of her designs were awarded prizes and publications in professional magazines.

During the seventies, Berman studied painting and drawing with Thierry Veltman, graduating with a teaching degree. In 1978, she immigrated to Israel, where she continued to refine her style. During a decade-long residence in Jaffa, she became part of the local artists' community and a member of the Israel Painters and Sculptors Association. Since 1998, she has been painting and exhibiting from her studio in Tel Mond.

Exhibitions

References

1936 births
Living people
20th-century Dutch women artists
21st-century Dutch women artists
Abstract expressionist artists
Art educators
Painters from Amsterdam
Design Academy Eindhoven alumni
Dutch emigrants to Israel
Dutch Jews
Dutch women painters
Dutch Holocaust survivors
Dutch Impressionist painters
Israeli Jews
Israeli people of Dutch-Jewish descent
Israeli women artists
People from Tel Mond
Postmodern artists
Textile designers
20th-century Dutch painters
20th-century Israeli painters
21st-century Dutch painters
21st-century Israeli painters
Artists from Beersheba
Westerbork transit camp survivors